Thomas McAllister may refer to:

 Thomas Francis McAllister (1896–1976), United States federal judge
 Thomas Stanislaus McAllister (1878–1950), Northern Irish politician
 Tom McAllister (footballer) (1882–1951), Scottish footballer
 Tom McAllister, member of the Shotts and Dykehead Pipe Band in Scotland in the 1940s
 Tom McAllister, member of the Irish People's Liberation Organisation in the 1980s
 Red John, a fictional serial killer revealed to be Sheriff Thomas McAllister, from the TV series The Mentalist

See also 
 Tom McAlister (born 1952), Scottish footballer